Eshkaftestan (also Romanized as Eshkaftestān and Eshkoftestān; also known as Eshkaft) is a village in Rostam-e Yek Rural District, in the Central District of Rostam County, Fars Province, Iran. At the 2006 census, its population was 107, in 20 families.

References 

Populated places in Rostam County